Derry Celtic Football Club was a football club from Derry, Ireland. The club, formed as St Columb's Hall  in 1890, changing to St Columb's Hall Celtic in 1893, and Derry Celtic in 1899, was once the primary team in the city, but was voted out of the Irish League in 1913 and is now defunct.

As St Columb's Hall Celtic, the club reached the Irish Cup final in the 1897-98 season, losing 0-2 to Linfield. The club competed in the Irish League for the first time in 1900-01, finishing its first season without a single win. Things began to improve in the next few seasons for Derry Celtic: the club picked up its first win in the 1901-02 season and achieved 6th place. They followed this up by finishing 5th in the 1902-03 season, however, this would prove to be Celtic's most successful season, only ever climbing to 5th once again in the 1909-10 season. In 1913, the club resigned from the Irish League defected to the Gaelic Athletic Association and never again played senior football. Derry City took over from the club as the city's main side after their formation in 1928 and their subsequent acceptance into the Irish League in 1929.

The club played at Celtic Park (now the Derry GAA stadium) from 1894 to 1900, and at the Brandywell (now Derry City's stadium) from 1900.

Honours

Senior honours
County Londonderry Cup/North West Senior Cup: 9
1893–94, 1894–95, 1895–96, 1896–97, 1897–98, 1898–99, 1900–01, 1901–02, 1902–03

References

 
Association football clubs in Derry Urban Area
Defunct association football clubs in Northern Ireland
Defunct Irish Football League clubs
Former senior Irish Football League clubs
Association football clubs established in 1890
Association football clubs disestablished in 1913
1890 establishments in Ireland
1913 disestablishments in Ireland